Year 241 (CCXLI) was a common year starting on Friday (link will display the full calendar) of the Julian calendar. At the time, it was known  as the Year of the Consulship of Gordianus and Pompeianus  by the Romans (or, less frequently, year 994 Ab urbe condita). The denomination 241 for this year has been used since the early medieval period, when the Anno Domini calendar era became the prevalent method in Europe for naming years.

Events 
 By place 
 Roman Empire 
 Winter – Emperor Gordian III reaches Antioch and, with his army, prepares an offensive against the Sassanids.
 Gaius Furius Sabinius Aquila Timesitheus becomes praetorian prefect and de facto ruler of the Roman Empire.

 Persia 
 Prince Shapur I succeeds his father Ardashir I as ruler of the Sassanid Empire. He begins his expansion in India.
 Shapur I annexes parts of the Kushan Empire. The ancient city of Bagram (modern Afghanistan) is abandoned.
 Fall of Hatra: Shapur I captures Hatra, the capital of the Kingdom of Hatra. The city is destroyed by the Sassanids.

 Europe 
 November 1 – The Battle of Samhain is fought in Ireland (approximate date).

 By topic 
 Religion 
 The Dura-Europos church is converted from a house in Syria (approximate date).

Births 
 Cao Mao, Chinese emperor of the Cao Wei state in the Three Kingdoms period (d. 260)

Deaths 
 Sanatruq II, king of Hatra (Ending of the Kingdom of Hatra)
 Sun Deng, Chinese prince of the Eastern Wu state (b. 209)
 Sun Shao, Chinese general of the Eastern Wu state (b. 188)
 Zhuge Jin, Chinese general of the Eastern Wu state (b. 174)

References